Kanimangalam is a suburb of Thrissur in the Thrissur district of the state of Kerala in south India. It is about 4 km away from Thrissur. The main center of Kanimangalam is Valiyalukkal, where the Valiyalukkal Bagavathy Temple is situated.  It is on the route between Thrissur and Kodungallur.Kanimangalam Sastha Temple is the  participant of the famous Thrissur Pooram. Kanimangalam Sastha is the first Pooram entering the Vadakkunnathan Temple and the protector of all goddesses who take part in Thrissur Pooram.

Kanimangalam is Ward 34 of Thrissur Municipal Corporation.

Temples
Kanimangalam has a Sastha temple, which is about 0.5 km from Valiyalukkal. There is a Shiva temple near to this Sastha temple, which is about 100 m away.

Geography
Kanimangalam is blessed by the god by making kole land in boundaries it is a natural drain the water in monsoon season

Worship Places

 Sri Valiyalukkal Bhagavathy Temple
 Kanimangalam Sastha Temple
 Kanimangalam Siva Temple
 Karamukku/Pookattikkara Temple
 Mullakkal Bhagavathy temple
 Vattappinni Bhagavathy temple
 St Therssa's Church

References

Cities and towns in Thrissur district
Suburbs of Thrissur city